Georgios Nasiopoulos (born 25 May 1973) is a retired Greek football striker.

References

1973 births
Living people
Greek footballers
Edessaikos F.C. players
Panathinaikos F.C. players
Kavala F.C. players
Iraklis Thessaloniki F.C. players
Atromitos F.C. players
Digenis Akritas Morphou FC players
APOEL FC players
Panachaiki F.C. players
Veria F.C. players
Eordaikos 2007 F.C. players
Super League Greece players
Cypriot First Division players
Association football forwards
Greece international footballers
Greek expatriate footballers
Expatriate footballers in Cyprus
Greek expatriate sportspeople in Cyprus
People from Thessaloniki (regional unit)
Footballers from Central Macedonia